The Azadi Velodrome is a  outdoor velodrome, with a concrete surface, that is part of the Azadi Sport Complex in Tehran, Iran. The stadium has an overpass, underpass and outdoor lights.

It hosted the 2014 Iran national track cycling championships.

Gallery

References

Velodromes in Iran
Sports venues in Tehran